Truckin' Magazine was a sport truck magazine published by TEN: The Enthusiast Network.

History
In 1974, then-publisher of Street Rodder  and Street Chopper  magazines, Tom McMullen, saw a growing trend in custom vans and pickups cruising around the Southern California street rod shows. Using the popular saying "Keep on Truckin'" as a basis, Truckin’ magazine was created. In 1975, the first issue went on sale at newsstands for $1.00 under the TRM Publications (which stood for Tom and Rose McMullen) family of auto magazines. From 1975 to May 1995, Truckin’ was published by McMullen Publications and McMullen-Yee Publishing. It was purchased by K-III's Primedia Inc. in June 1995 in a merger worth $55 million. In 2007, Source Interlink Media acquired more than 78 consumer magazines, including Truckin’. In December 2019, the Motor Trend Group, the final company that published Truckin', announced that Truckin would cease publication along with 18 other magazines.

Editors
Robert K. Smith, the production manager with Street Rodder magazine, headed up the inaugural issue of Truckin’. This also included managing editor Steve Stillwell, who in 1985 would run the title into the late 1990s. Other editors include Dick DeLoach, Kevin Wilson, Dan Sanchez (2000–2002), Steve Warner (2002–2008), and Dan Ward (2008–2014). The final Editor-in-Chief was Jeremy Cook (2014–2020).Staff, Truckin' magazine

Frequency and sales
In 1975, the first issue was to be a "one-shot," a publishing term for once a year. The magazine was immediately turned into a quarterly, and within one year it was monthly. In 2003 Truckin’ added an extra issue entitled the "Fall Issue." In 2004, it was called the "Spring Issue," and has since been dubbed "Issue 13".

At the peak of magazine sales, the magazine was more than 440 pages.Circulation'

257,300 in 2002

90,752 in 2012

References

External links

Monthly magazines published in the United States
Transport magazines published in the United States
Magazines established in 1975
Magazines published in Los Angeles
Quarterly magazines published in the United States
Defunct magazines published in the United States